The Kamppi Chapel is a chapel in Kamppi, Helsinki, located on the Narinkka Square. It is also known as the "Chapel of Silence" since it is intended to be a place to calm down and have a moment of silence in one of the busiest areas in Finland.

The chapel is operated on a partnership basis by the Helsinki Parish Union and the Social Services Department of the City of Helsinki, while the parish unions of the neighbouring cities of Espoo and Vantaa also participate in the chapel's activities. Regular church services are not being held in the chapel, though it is planned to hold regular moments of prayer in the future.

Ecumenical Chapel 

The chapel is ecumenical and welcomes everyone irrespective of religion, philosophy of life or background. The chapel's overall design (both on the interior and exterior) is very austere and simplistic, as well as mostly neutral, bearing some semblance to a multi-faith prayer room.
The representatives of both the parishes and the Social Services Department are available in the chapel for personal discussions.

The chapel was constructed as a part of the World Design Capital program in 2012. It was designed by architects Kimmo Lintula, Niko Sirola and Mikko Summanen of K2S Architects Ltd., and won the International Architecture Awards in 2010. The chapel became popular immediately after it was opened: some 250,000 people had visited by January 2013; a year later the chapel received its 500,000th visitor. CNN called the building an architectural landmark and said: "The chapel demonstrates how contemporary architecture at its best can fascinate and inspire."

References

External links

Kamppi Chapel

Churches in Helsinki
Wooden churches in Finland
Kamppi
Churches completed in 2012
2012 establishments in Finland